The Old Linn County Jail, also known as City Hall, at 312 Main Street in Mound City in Linn County, Kansas was built in 1867–68.  It was listed on the National Register of Historic Places in 1978.

The building began serving as city hall for Mound City in 1903.

See also
Linn County Courthouse, also NRHP-listed in Mound City

References

Jails on the National Register of Historic Places in Kansas
Government buildings completed in 1868
Jails in Kansas
Linn County, Kansas